Kanō Station is the name of multiple railway stations in Japan.

 Kanō Station (Miyazaki) in Kiyotake, Miyazaki, served by the JR Nippo Main Line
 Kanō Station (Gifu) in Gifu, Gifu, served by the Meitetsu Nagoya Main Line
 Gifu Station in Gifu, Gifu, originally called Kanō Station when it opened, served by Central Japan Railway